Goindwal Sahib Power Plant is a coal-based thermal power plant located at Goindwal Sahib in Tarn Taran district in the Indian state of Punjab. The power plant is operated by the GVK Group.

The coal for the power plant will be sourced from Tokisud and Seregarha coal mines in state of Jharkhand.

Capacity
The planned capacity of the power plant is 540 MW (2x270 MW).

References

Coal-fired power stations in Punjab, India
Tarn Taran district
2016 establishments in Punjab, India
Energy infrastructure completed in 2016